Mayara Magri may refer to:

Mayara Magri (actress), Brazilian actress
Mayara Magri (dancer), Brazilian dancer